Tom MacRury (born 21 August 1994) is a New Zealand cricketer. He made his Twenty20 debut for Canterbury in the 2018–19 Super Smash on 26 January 2019.

References

External links
 

1994 births
Living people
New Zealand cricketers
Canterbury cricketers
Place of birth missing (living people)